Vinette is a feminine given name and a surname. People with the name are as follows:

Given name
 Vinette Ebrahim (born 1957), South African actress 
 Vinette Robinson (born 1981), British actress

Surname
 Alice Vinette (1894–1989), Canadian composer

Feminine given names